Pseudochorthippus is a genus of grasshoppers in the tribe Gomphocerini.   Insects including the 'meadow grasshopper' were previously placed in the genus Chorthippus, but are now placed here in species group parallelus (Zetterstedt, 1821).  Species have been recorded from Western Europe, throughout temperate Asia and North America.

Species
Pseudochorthippus includes the species:
 Pseudochorthippus curtipennis (Harris, 1835): N. America
 Pseudochorthippus montanus (Charpentier, 1825): mainland Europe: the 'water-meadow grasshopper'
 Pseudochorthippus parallelus (Zetterstedt, 1821) – type species (as Gryllus parallelus Zetterstedt = P. parallelus parallelus): the European 'meadow grasshopper'
 Pseudochorthippus tatrae (Harz, 1971): E. Europe

References

External links 
 

Acrididae genera
Orthoptera of Europe 
Gomphocerinae